Przemysław Tadeusz Kaźmierczak (born 5 May 1982) is a Polish retired footballer who played as a midfielder. Besides Poland, he has played in England and Portugal.

During a 15-year professional career, he amassed Ekstraklasa totals of 145 games and 21 goals over the course of seven seasons. He also competed professionally in Portugal (three years) and England (one, with Derby County).

Club career
Kaźmierczak was born in Łęczyca. After entering ŁKS Łódź's youth ranks at the age of eight, and spending the following decade there, he started his professional career in 2000 with lowly Piotrcovia Piotrków Trybunalski, playing three seasons with the club.

In 2003 Kaźmierczak moved to Pogoń Szczecin, establishing as an Ekstraklasa player. He then served a loan in Portugal with Boavista F.C. during the 2006–07 campaign, where he scored five Primeira Liga goals and played alongside compatriot Rafał Grzelak.

After solid overall displays, Boavista neighbours FC Porto paid Pogoń around €1.4 million to acquire Kaźmierczak's services. He helped the northerners retain their domestic supremacy, but appeared sparingly (11 league games, plus 65 minutes in a 1–4 loss at Liverpool for the group stage of the UEFA Champions League).

Kaźmierczak's disappointing first year at Porto saw him linked with a move away from the club and, on 21 July 2008, he joined English Football League Championship side Derby County on a season-long loan, with a view to a £1.3m permanent deal. After coming on as a substitute he scored his first goal for his new team with a clinical finish against Norwich City, in a 3–1 win.

However, Kaźmierczak fell out of favour under new Derby manager Nigel Clough, and finished the season with 22 league appearances, scoring twice. He later revealed his frustration at being left out of the team, accusing the coach of "not liking foreign [players]", and that "I have made up my mind – I want to leave. It is all over. I am leaving Derby County". Clough responded to the player's accusations, saying "Is that what he said, is it? I have got no problems with foreign players at all. If they have got the right character and they want to fight tooth and nail for Derby County, we will have players whether they are Chinese, American, Spanish – anyone to help us get three points."

On 14 July 2009 Porto arranged for another loan deal for Kaźmierczak, who joined Vitória de Setúbal on a season-long move. The following year he was released and returned to his country, signing for Śląsk Wrocław.

International career
Whilst at Piotrcovia Piotrków, Kaźmierczak was called into the Polish under-18 national team, helping them win the 2001 UEFA European Championship in Finland. He eventually forced his way into the full side following his stint with Boavista, scoring once during UEFA Euro 2008 qualifiers and helping his country qualify for the final stages in Austria and Switzerland, for which he was not finally picked.

International goals

Honours
Porto
Primeira Liga: 2007–08

Śląsk Wrocław
Ekstraklasa: 2011–12
Polish SuperCup: 2012

References

External links

National team data 

1982 births
Living people
People from Łęczyca
Sportspeople from Łódź Voivodeship
Polish footballers
Association football midfielders
Ekstraklasa players
I liga players
ŁKS Łódź players
Górnik Łęczna players
Pogoń Szczecin players
Śląsk Wrocław players
Primeira Liga players
Boavista F.C. players
FC Porto players
Vitória F.C. players
English Football League players
Derby County F.C. players
Poland international footballers
Polish expatriate footballers
Expatriate footballers in Portugal
Expatriate footballers in England
Polish expatriate sportspeople in Portugal